Doug Beason (born 1953) is an American scientist and science fiction author.

He graduated from the United States Air Force Academy in 1977 with a dual major in physics and math.  He started his first novel while at the Academy after returning there as an officer in the 1980s to teach physics.  He is a retired Air Force Colonel with a PhD in physics.  He is also a Fellow of the American Physical Society and has published two non-fiction books. His book "Science and Technology Policy for the post-Cold War: A Case for Long-Term Research", was awarded the National Defense University President's Strategic Vision award. He also worked on a few books, (e.g. Lifeline, The Trinity Paradox, and Nanospace) with Kevin J. Anderson.  In 2008, he retired from his position as Associate Laboratory Director for Threat Reduction at the Los Alamos National Laboratory. He currently writes full-time, lectures, and consults.

Bibliography

Novels
Return to Honor (1989)
Assault on Alpha Base (1990)
Strike Eagle (1991)
Wild Blue U (2005)
Return to Honor (2014)
The Cadet (2015)
The Officer (2016)
Space Station Down (2020), Co-Authored with Ben Bova

Co-authored with Kevin J. Anderson
Lifeline (1990)
The Trinity Paradox (1991)
Assemblers of Infinity  (1993)
Ill Wind  (1995)
Ignition  (1997)
Kill Zone (2019)

Craig Kreident Series:
Virtual Destruction (1996)
Fallout (1997)
Lethal Exposure (1998)

Short fiction

Non-fiction
Science and Technology Policy for the post-Cold War: A Case for Long-Term Research
The E-Bomb: How America's new directed energy weapons will change the way future wars will be fought (2005)

References

External links
http://www.dougbeason.com
http://www.wordfire.com/

American science fiction writers
Living people
United States Air Force Academy alumni
20th-century American novelists
20th-century American male writers
21st-century American novelists
American male novelists
21st-century American male writers
1953 births